The national colours of Serbia are red, blue and white, the flag of Serbia being commonly called trobojka (the tricolour). This flag was adopted in 1835.

See also
List of flags of Serbia
Jemstvenik

References

 

Serbia
National symbols of Serbia
Pan-Slavism